Alison Norlen (born 1962, Winnipeg, Manitoba) is a visual artist who is known for large-scale drawing and sculpture installation. Her work is in private collections across the United States and Canada and in the public collections of the National Gallery of Canada, The Mackenzie Art Gallery, the Confederation Centre Art Gallery, The Rooms Provincial Art Gallery, the Winnipeg Art Gallery, the Mendel Art Gallery, the Manitoba Art Council, The Canada Council Art Bank, and the Saskatchewan Arts Board.

Life and education 
Norlen grew up in Kenora, Ontario. She received a Bachelor of Fine Arts degree (Honours, First Class) from the School of Art at the University of Manitoba in 1987 and a Master of Fine Arts from Yale University in New Haven, Connecticut, in 1989. Before beginning her career as a visual artist she trained as a barber.

Career 
Inspired by built spectacles such as West Edmonton Mall, Disneyland, Universal Studios, Las Vegas, roadside attractions, circuses and carnival celebrations, her work is characterized by its grand scale and intricate detail. Her work is significantly influenced by theater and film, particularly the work of the Depression-era film and theatrical choreographer Busby Berkeley.

Alison Norlen is currently a professor of painting and drawing at the University of Saskatchewan in the faculty of Art & Art History. She was awarded the University of Saskatchewan College of Arts and Science Teaching Excellence Award in 2011.

Solo exhibitions

Select group exhibitions 
 MosaiCanada: Sign & Sound, Seoul Korea (2003)
 Inklinations, York Quay, Toronto (2003).
 In My Solitude, Manny Neubacher Gallery, Toronto (2003).
 Occur/Blur, Winnipeg Art Gallery, Winnipeg (2003).
 Tekeningen III, Quartair Art Contemporary Art Initiatives Dutch/Canada, Den Haag, Holland (2002).
 Figment, Two Rivers Gallery, Prince George (2002). 
 After the Grain Elevator: Re-imaging the Prairie Icon, Art Gallery of Prince Albert (Oct 13 - Nov 26, 2000).

References 

20th-century Canadian women artists
20th-century Canadian artists
21st-century Canadian women artists
21st-century Canadian artists
Artists from Winnipeg
Living people
1962 births
University of Manitoba alumni
Yale University alumni
Fellows of the Royal Society of Canada